Woe to the Vanquished is the fifth studio album by the American thrash metal band Warbringer. It is the band's first album for Napalm Records, and the first to feature bassist Jessie Sanchez and lead guitarist Chase Becker. The album also marks the return of rhythm guitarist Adam Carroll, who last played on 2011's Worlds Torn Asunder.

Production and release
After the departure of drummer Carlos Cruz and guitarists John Laux and Jeff Potts in the spring of 2014, Warbringer entered a period of inactivity. The band returned in 2015 with a short-lived new lineup, which was soon replaced with the returning Cruz, lead guitarist Chase Becker, and bassist Jessie Sanchez. This lineup debuted on an early 2016 tour with Exmortus and Enforcer. Following the tour the band entered West Valley Studios with producer Mike Plotnikoff to record their fifth album. The album's title and artwork were revealed in December 2016, and music videos for the songs "Silhouettes" and "Remain Violent" were released in the months leading up to the album's release.

Track listing
All music by Adam Carroll, Carlos Cruz and John Kevill. All lyrics by John Kevill

Personnel 
Warbringer
John Kevill – lead vocals
Chase Becker – guitars
Adam Carroll – guitars
Jessie Sanchez – bass
Carlos Cruz – drums, rhythm guitar on "Shellfire", "Silhouettes", "Spectral Asylum", and "When the Guns Fell Silent"

Additional personnel
Mike Plotnikoff – production
Howie Weinberg – mastering 
Andreas Marschall – artwork
Joe Rickard – drum technician
Hatch Inigaki – engineering

Charts

References 

2017 albums
Warbringer albums
Napalm Records albums